50 to 1 is a 2014 American drama film based on the true story of Mine That Bird, an undersized thoroughbred racehorse who won the 2009 Kentucky Derby in one of the biggest upsets in the history of the race.  The film received a limited release on March 21, 2014. It was directed by Jim Wilson, who also co-wrote the script with Faith Conroy, and stars Skeet Ulrich, Christian Kane and William Devane.  Jockey Calvin Borel, who rode Mine that Bird to his upset Derby win, plays himself in the film.

Plot
A misfit group of New Mexico cowboys find themselves on the journey of a lifetime when their undersized thoroughbred racehorse qualifies for the Kentucky Derby. Based on the inspiring true story of Mine That Bird, the cowboys face a series of mishaps on their way to Churchill Downs, becoming the ultimate underdogs in a final showdown with the world's racing elite.  Mine That Bird pulls off a monumental upset (at 50-to-1 odds) by winning the 2009 Kentucky Derby.

Cast
 Skeet Ulrich as Chip Woolley
 Christian Kane as Mark Allen 
 William Devane as Leonard "Doc" Blach
 Madelyn Deutch as Alex
 Todd Lowe as Kelly
 Calvin Borel as Himself

Reception
Gary Goldstein of the Los Angeles Times thought the film was slow-moving and the characters lacked interest, and the film "an idea better in theory than in practice".  Michael O'Sullivan of The Washington Post said that as with real-life horse racing, "the exciting part lasts only a minute or two, and then it’s over. The rest of the movie is filler (or maybe foreplay)." Bill Edelstein of Variety commented that the film's attempt to appeal to a faith-based audience seemed "a rather calculated play near the finish".  On the other hand, he thought Calvin Borel turned out to be "adept at slapstick" and found Borel's character to be "more compelling than the leads".  Lawrence Toppman of The Charlotte Observer gave the film a positive review, finding the film's "old-fashioned" qualities appealing.

References

External links

2014 films
2010s sports drama films
American horse racing films
Films set in 2009
American sports drama films
2014 drama films
2010s English-language films
2010s American films